Baines Nunatak is a nunatak rising to  to the east of Bernhardi Heights and  northwest of Jackson Tooth, Pioneers Escarpment, in the Shackleton Range. It was photographed from the air by the U.S. Navy, 1967, surveyed by the British Antarctic Survey, 1968–71, and named in 1977 by the UK Antarctic Place-Names Committee after Thomas Baines (1822–75), an English explorer and joint author, with William Barry Lord, of Shifts and Expedients of Camp Life, Travel and Exploration (London, 1871).

References 

Nunataks of Coats Land